Danguwapasi is a census town in Pashchimi Singhbhum district  in the state of Jharkhand, India.

Demographics
 India census, Danguwapasi had a population of 5,174. Males constitute 53% of the population and females 47%. Danguwapasi has an average literacy rate of 68%, higher than the national average of 59.5%; male literacy is 78% and female literacy is 56%. In Danguwapasi, 14% of the population is under 6 years of age.

Transport

Railway

Danguwapasi is also a railway station, which is known as Dangoaposi, as per railway records. It falls on Tatanagar–Barbil line of SER. (See Tatanagar–Bilaspur section of Howrah-Nagpur-Mumbai line).

There are many trains passing through Dangoaposi and all of these trains have stoppage at Dangoaposi such as-

•Howrah-Barbil Jan Shatabdi Express (Train No. - 12021/12022) running daily,

•Tatanagar-Visakhapatnam Weekly Express (Train No. - 20815/20816) running every Monday,

•Barbil-Puri Intercity Express (Train No. 18415/18416) running daily,

•Rourkela-Barbil Intercity Express (Train No. 18403/18404) running daily,

•Tatanagar-Barbil Passenger (Train No. - 58103/58104) running daily,

•Tatanagar-Gua Passenger (Train No. - 58109/58110) running daily,

•Tatanagar-Gua DEMU Passenger (Train No. - 78033/78034) running on all week days except Sunday.

Air 

An air strip is located at a distance of 4 km from Dangoaposi and is in operation and maintained by Tata Steel.

References

Cities and towns in West Singhbhum district